Torchy Blane in Chinatown is a 1939 American crime mystery film directed by William Beaudine and starring Glenda Farrell and Barton MacLane. Released on February 4, 1939, it is the seventh film in the Torchy Blane film series by Warner Bros. and is followed by Torchy Runs for Mayor (1939). The rivalry between newspaper reporter Torchy Blane and her boyfriend, Lieutenant Steve McBride, escalates as the two investigate a death threat involving priceless jade tablets.

Plot
On behalf of Senator Baldwin (Henry O'Neill), the owner of the world's largest Chinese jade collection, detective Steve McBride (Barton MacLane) investigate a death threat involving the priceless jade tablets that were brought to the United States by three adventurers, who are now on the hit list of an oriental gang. A note written in Chinese warns the impending doom at midnight unless a ransom is paid for the valuable jades, which have been stolen. Steve is put on the case to protect the people who were involved in smuggling the jades into the country.

That night, Torchy Blane (Glenda Farrell) joins Steve at the Adventurers Club where he and his assistant Gahagan (Tom Kennedy) are guarding the threatened victims, Fitzhugh, Mr. Mansfield (James Stephenson) and Captain Condon (Patric Knowles). Once midnight has passed, they leave, but Fitzhugh is machine-gunned in his car and killed. A note found in the car warns that Mansfield will be the next to die. He is later found dead after smoking a poisoned cigarette, and his body vanishes mysteriously before the coroner arrives at the crime scene.

Senator Baldwin's daughter Janet Baldwin and her fiancé Dick Staunton, are ordered by the mysterious killer to deliver $250,000 ransom to the last buoy in the New York city harbor. Torchy discovered that Fitzhugh's fingerprints and those of the body in the morgue do not match. She joins Steve in a US Navy submarine as Dick rides out to pay the ransom. At the appointed place, Torchy and Steve surface in the submarine, just in time to save Dick and prove that the murders were all part of an elaborate plot by Fitzhugh, Mansfield, and Condon to extort money from Senator Baldwin.

Cast
 Glenda Farrell as Torchy Blane
 Barton MacLane as Lieutenant Steve McBride 
 Tom Kennedy as Gahagan
 Henry O'Neill as Senator Baldwin
 Patric Knowles as Captain Condon
 James Stephenson as Mr. Mansfield
 Janet Shaw as Janet Baldwin

Home media
Warner Archive released a boxed set DVD collection featuring all nine Torchy Blane films on March 29, 2011.

References

External links
 
 
 
 

1939 films
1930s mystery films
1930s crime films
American black-and-white films
American crime comedy films
American detective films
1930s English-language films
Films about journalists
Films directed by William Beaudine
Warner Bros. films
American mystery films
Torchy Blane films
1930s American films